Madonna and Child with Saints or Madonna and Child with Saint Elizabeth, St Catherine and the Infant John the Baptist is an oil painting on canvas painted by Paolo Veronese c.1565–1570. It is now in the Timken Museum of Art in San Diego.

John the Baptist is shown as an infant reaching up to the Virgin Mary whilst his mother Elizabeth kneels by a crib to the left and Catherine of Alexandria at the right reaches up to the Christ Child in a gesture akin to depictions of her Mystic Marriage.

The work may have been mentioned in 1648 by Carlo Ridolfi as belonging to the painter's heirs, suggesting it was still in his studio on his death According to Cicogna, in the 19th century it belonged to Abbot Celotti. It was next owned by Bondon in Paris until 1831. It was bought by Norman Clark Neill of Cowes in 1925 and later to Mrs HF Buxton of London before being acquired by the Putnam Foundation in 1956.

References

1570 paintings
Veronese
Paintings depicting John the Baptist
Paintings of Elizabeth (biblical figure)
Veronese
Paintings in the collection of the Timken Museum of Art
Paintings by Paolo Veronese